The Washington State Senate is the upper house of the Washington State Legislature. The body consists of 49 members, each representing a district with a population of nearly 160,000. The State Senate meets at the Legislative Building in Olympia.

As with the lower House of Representatives, state senators serve without term limits, though senators serve four-year terms. Senators are elected from the same legislative districts as House members, with each district electing one senator and two representatives. Terms are staggered so that half the Senate is up for reelection every two years.

Like other upper houses of state and territorial legislatures and the federal U.S. Senate, the state senate can confirm or reject gubernatorial appointments to the state cabinet, commissions and boards.

Leadership
The state constitution allows both houses to write their own rules of procedure (article II, section 9) and to elect their own officers (article II, section 10) with the proviso that the lieutenant governor may preside in each house and has a deciding vote in the senate, but that the senate may choose a "temporary president" in the absence of the lieutenant governor. The prevailing two-party system has produced current senate rules to the effect that the President Pro Tempore is nominated by the majority party caucus and elected by the entire Senate.

Lieutenant Governor Denny Heck is constitutionally the President of the Senate. The current President Pro Tempore is Karen Keiser. The Majority leader is Democrat Andy Billig. The Minority Leader is Republican John Braun.

Composition

Members (2023–2025, 68th Legislature)

 † Originally appointed
 ^ Originally elected in special election
 # Sworn in early to fill vacant seat

Past composition of the Senate

See also
Washington State Capitol
Washington State Legislature
Washington House of Representatives
 List of Washington state legislatures

References

External links
Washington State Senate
Map of Legislative Districts

Washington State Legislature
Government of Washington (state)
State upper houses in the United States